Renuka Majumder (born 15 September 1962) is an Indian former cricketer who played as a right-arm medium bowler and right-handed batter. She appeared in six One Day Internationals for International XI at the 1982 World Cup. She played domestic cricket for Delhi.

References

External links
 
 

Living people
1962 births
Indian women cricketers
International XI women One Day International cricketers
Delhi women cricketers